This is a list of Grammy nominated American producer Rick Nowels' songwriting and production credits.

Rick Nowels production discography

References

Pop music discographies
Song recordings produced by Rick Nowels